The Gheorghe Roşca Codreanu National College is a high school in the city of Bârlad, Romania.

The school was established by Gheorghe and Neculai Roșca Codreanu as a gymnasium in 1858, being upgraded to a complete high school in 1864. It is the fourth high school established in Romania, after the ones in Bucharest, Iași, and Craiova. The present building of the school was inaugurated on April 27, 1886. It is listed as a historic monument by Romania's Ministry of Culture and Religious Affairs.

Alumni
Alexandru Vlahuță
Nicolae Bagdasar
Martin Bercovici
Paul Bujor
Constantin Chiriță
Constantin Hamangiu
George Ivașcu
Vasile Pârvan
Alexandru Philippide
Ștefan Procopiu
Gheorghe Tașcă
Ștefan Zeletin

References

External links
 Official Website: Gheorghe Roșca Codreanu National College
 Video presentation of the High School 

Schools in Vaslui County
Educational institutions established in 1858
1858 establishments in the Ottoman Empire
19th-century establishments in Moldavia
Bârlad
National Colleges in Romania
Historic monuments in Vaslui County